The Roman Catholic Diocese of Bielsko–Żywiec is a diocese located in the cities of Bielsko and Żywiec in the Ecclesiastical province of Kraków in Poland.

It was established as the Diocese of Bielsko–Żywiec from the Diocese of Katowice and Metropolitan Archdiocese of Kraków on 25 March 1992. In 2013 about a half of the then Catholic Church members attended church services at least once per week.

Leadership
Bishops of Bielsko–Żywiec (Roman rite)
 Bishop Tadeusz Rakoczy (25 March 1992 − 16 November 2013)
 Bishop Roman Pindel (since 6 January 2014)

Gallery

See also
Roman Catholicism in Poland

Sources
 GCatholic.org
 Catholic Hierarchy
  Diocese website

References

Roman Catholic dioceses in Poland
Christian organizations established in 1992
Bielsko-Biała
Żywiec
Roman Catholic Diocese of Bielsko–Żywiec
Roman Catholic dioceses and prelatures established in the 20th century